Cucurbăta Mare, also known as Bihor Peak, is a mountain in the Bihor Mountains. It is located in the southeastern part of Bihor County, near the border with Alba County, in Romania.

References

External links
Video of mountain biker ascent

Mountains of Romania